The George Sturges House is a single-family house, designed by architect Frank Lloyd Wright and built for George D. Sturges in the Brentwood Heights neighborhood of Brentwood, Los Angeles, California.  Designed and built in 1939, the one-story residence is fairly small compared to 21st century standards, 1,200 square feet (110 m2), but features a 21-foot panoramic deck. The home is made out of concrete, steel, brick and redwood.  Wright hired Taliesin fellow John Lautner to oversee its construction.

The Sturges House is the only structure in Southern California built in the modern style Wright called Usonian design.  Other Wright homes in the area were built in the 1920s with interlocking, pre-cast concrete blocks, which he named "textile block" style, and seen in such homes as the Ennis House.

The house was owned by actor Jack Larson.  After his death in 2015 the house was to be put up for auction, with the proceeds to benefit the nonprofit Bridges/Larson Foundation.   In February 2016 Los Angeles Modern Auctions announced that no qualified bidder had registered, and it was withdrawn. 
The George Sturges House can be viewed easily from the street (449 N. Skyewiay Road). It was designated as Los Angeles Historic-Cultural Monument #577 on May 25, 1993.

References

Storrer, William Allin. The Frank Lloyd Wright Companion. University Of Chicago Press, 2006,  (S.272)

External links
 Sturges House Foundation website

Frank Lloyd Wright buildings
Houses in Los Angeles
Brentwood, Los Angeles
Houses completed in 1939
Los Angeles Historic-Cultural Monuments
1939 in California